Hayden Hodgson (born March 2, 1996) is a Canadian professional ice hockey right winger playing for the Lehigh Valley Phantoms of the AHL as a prospect to the Philadelphia Flyers of the National Hockey League (NHL).

Early life 
Hodgson was born on March 2, 1996, in Windsor, Ontario, to Christine and Todd Hodgson. He grew up playing ice hockey, baseball, and golf in Leamington, Ontario, and spent most of his adolescence deciding whether he would pursue hockey or baseball professionally. Despite collecting several awards for golf, he abandoned that sport when his golf swing negatively impacted his baseball batting. Hodgson spent the 2011–12 season playing minor ice hockey for the Sun County Panthers of the Alliance Hockey organization, scoring 21 goals and recording 41 points in 28 games, while pitching for the Windsor Selects under-16 team.

Playing career

Junior 
The Erie Otters of the Ontario Hockey League (OHL) drafted Hodgson in the third round, 44th overall, of the 2012 OHL Priority Selection. His first OHL goal came on October 24 as part of the Otters' 7–1 rout of the Saginaw Spirit. He did not score again until November 23, when he recorded the first goal in the Otters' 3–2 loss to the Guelph Storm. On February 24, Hodgson collided with Henri Ikonen of the Kingston Frontenacs. He was assessed a major interference penalty and was ejected from the game, while Ikonen, who was leading the Frontenacs at that point with 48 points, sustained a concussion. The OHL issued Hodgson a ten-game suspension for the hit, and as the suspension came with only seven games left in the 2012–13 season, Hodgson's rookie year ended early. He recorded eight goals and 12 points in 60 games.

Hodgson recorded the first goal of his sophomore OHL season on November 11, 2013, in a 5–3 win over the Niagara IceDogs. After acquiring four goals, nine points, and 45 penalty minutes in 34 games with Erie during the 2013–14 season, Hodgson was traded to the Sarnia Sting on January 10, 2014, in exchange for a third-round pick in the 2015 OHL Priority Selection. In his first game with his new team, Hodgson was assessed a major penalty for an illegal check to the head of Plymouth Whalers skater Liam Dunda. After review, he was suspended for another 10 games. After the trade, Hodgson recorded five goals, nine points, and 19 penalty minutes in 18 games with Sarnia.

After joining the Detroit Red Wings' rookie camp on a free agent National Hockey League (NHL) tryout, Hodgson returned to the Sting for the 2014–15 season.

On January 12, 2016, the Sting sent Hodgson to the Saginaw Spirit in exchange for centre Devon Paliani and four picks in the upcoming draft. Hodgson had struggled to that point with the Sting, with only five goals in 36 games.

Professional 
On March 23, 2017, Hodgson signed a contract with the Cleveland Monsters, the American Hockey League (AHL) affiliate of the Columbus Blue Jackets.

On March 22, 2022, the Flyers signed Hodgson to an NHL contract for the remainder of the  season, with an average annual value of $750,000. He made his NHL debut two nights later when the Flyers faced the St. Louis Blues, filling in for an injured Oskar Lindblom. At the time, he had recorded 16 goals and 29 points in 44 games with the Phantoms. Hodgson recorded his first NHL goal and assist in his debut, and the Flyers won 5–2 at the Enterprise Center, their first win on the road of 2022.

Career statistics

References

External links 
 

1996 births
Living people
Canadian ice hockey forwards
Cleveland Monsters players
Erie Otters players
Florida Everblades players
HC 07 Detva players
Ice hockey people from Ontario
Lehigh Valley Phantoms players
Manchester Monarchs (ECHL) players
Philadelphia Flyers players
Reading Royals players
Saginaw Spirit players
Sarnia Sting players
Sportspeople from Windsor, Ontario
Undrafted National Hockey League players
Utah Grizzlies (ECHL) players
Wheeling Nailers players
Wichita Thunder players
Canadian expatriate ice hockey players in Slovakia
Canadian expatriate ice hockey players in the United States